The National Commission for Competition Defense (CNDC) is the chief competition regulatory agency in Argentina. The CNDC operates within the Ministry of Productive Development and is tasked with curbing anti-competitive behavior in the Argentinian economy.

History 
The CNDC was established on August 1, 1980 in Law 22,262, where it was developed to function similar to European competition law as articulated in the Treaty of Rome. Under Law 22,262, violations of Argentine competition law constituted a criminal offense subject to scrutiny by a criminal court. During the 1990s, economic liberals argued that Law 22,262 was antiquated, and pushed for the adoption of the Argentine Competition Law (Law 25,156, ACL).

The ACL was adopted in 1994 and removed the possibility of criminal charges against violators of competition law. Instead, it created a new body, the National Tribunal for the Defence of Competition (TDC) to oversee punish competition law violations. As of 2020, the last time the CNDC blocked a merger was 2007, thirteen years prior.

Future 
In 2018, legislation was enacted to create a new body to replace the CNDC, the National Competition Authority (NCA). However, as of 2021, this body has not come into effect.

Functions 
The CNDC is responsible for the "defense of competition against all forms of market distortion" as articulated in Article 42 of the Constitution. The CNDC advocates for consumer welfare under the logic that a competitive market economy leads to a high quality of goods and services and innovation. The CNDC is responsible for analyzing potential violations of competition law in certain markets and carrying out subsequent enforcement actions to curb anti-competitive behavior.

Membership 
The CNDC is made up of an agency president and four members. The members serve four year terms, subject to renewal. In addition to these officials, the CNDC also employs 91 personnel, including 40 attorneys and 25 economists. As of 2020, the agency's annual budget amounts to around  65.4 million pesos.

The current president of the CNDC is Rodrigo Luchinsky, a former law professor at the University of Buenos Aires who previously served as Undersecretary of Security under President Cristina Fernández de Kirchner.

References 

Competition regulators
Government of Argentina
Competition law